Jorge Alberto García (born 12 November 1956) is a former Argentine football player and manager.

He won two league titles in Argentina with Rosario Central in 1980 and River Plate in 1981.

He also played for San Lorenzo and Unión de Santa Fe.

After retiring as a player, García want on to become a football coach in El Salvador.

Honours

Playing

Club
Rosario Central
Primera División Argentina: Nacional 1980

River Plate
Primera División Argentina: Nacional 1981

Manager

Club
Atlético Balboa
Copa Presidente
 Champion: 2005-2006

References

External links
 “No todo está mal en Limeño” at El Salvador.com
 San Lorenzo profile
http://www.elsalvador.com/mwedh/nota/nota_completa.asp?idCat=6429&idArt=3984131

Living people
1956 births
Footballers from Rosario, Santa Fe
Argentine footballers
Association football defenders
Rosario Central footballers
Club Atlético River Plate footballers
San Lorenzo de Almagro footballers
Unión de Santa Fe footballers
Argentine Primera División players
Argentine football managers
Municipal Limeño managers
C.D. Águila managers
Expatriate football managers in El Salvador